The 1977 Women's British Open Squash Championships was held at Wembley in London from 25 February - 3 March 1977. Heather McKay (née Blundell) won her sixteenth consecutive title defeating Barbara Wall in the final. The 1977 final saw the first ever all professional final and the first unseeded player (Wall) in a final. Sue Cogswell became the first woman to take a game from Heather McKay since Marion Jackman in 1972 and the first in the British Open since 1964.
.

Seeds

Draw and results

First round

Second round

Third round

Quarter-finals

Semi-finals

Final

References

Women's British Open Squash Championships
Women's British Open Squash Championship
Women's British Open Squash Championship
Squash competitions in London
Women's British Open
British Open Squash Championship
Women's British Open Squash Championship
Women's British Open Squash Championship